Costas Kapitanis (born 21 May 1964 in Larnaca, Cyprus) is a former Cypriot professional football referee. He was a full international for FIFA since 1996. He was appointed on 1999 FIFA U-17 World Championship and refereed some UEFA Champions League matches.

References 

1964 births
Living people
Cypriot football referees